Paranonychus is a genus of harvestman in the family Paranonychidae. There are at least three described species in Paranonychus.

Species
These three species belong to the genus Paranonychus:
 Paranonychus brunneus (Banks, 1893), found from Oregon north to Alaska.
 Paranonychus concolor Briggs, 1971, found in a single location in the Oregon Cascade range.
 Paranonychus fuscus,  found throughout northern Honshu in Japan.

References

Further reading

 
 
 
 

Harvestmen
Articles created by Qbugbot